At least two warships of Japan have borne the name Hamakaze:

 , an Imperial Japanese Navy  launched in 1916 and scrapped in 1935
 , an Imperial Japanese Navy  launched in 1940 and sunk in 1945

Japanese Navy ship names
Imperial Japanese Navy ship names